In modern English, the nouns vates and ovate ( ), are used as technical terms for ancient Celtic bards, prophets and philosophers. The terms correspond to a Proto-Celtic word which can be reconstructed as *wātis. They are sometimes also used as English equivalents to later Celtic terms such as Irish  "prophet, seer".

History of terminology

The terminology discussed in this article relates to an Old Celtic word which can be reconstructed as *wātis. This word is not directly attested, but is known from renderings into Greek and Latin and from its descendants in later Celtic languages.

Vates in English is a borrowing of a Latin noun vātēs, 'prophet, poet'. This Latin noun was either a cognate of Celtic *wātis (whereby the two words were descended from a common Italo-Celtic origin), or the Latin word was a loanword directly from Celtic. Despite being borrowed from the Latin form, the English word is generally used about ancient Celtic seers rather than Roman ones.

Ovate in English is a borrowing and adaptation of a Greek rendering of the same Celtic term *wātis, first attested in the work of the Ancient Greek writer Strabo. Strabo rendered the Celtic term in Greek in the plural as ouáteis. The English word ovate is pronounced the way it is due to a misunderstanding of how the Greek word was pronounced.

Proto-Celtic *wātis developed in medieval Irish as  "prophet, seer". Less directly, it is related to gwawd "panegyric" in Welsh.

Celtic wātis is widely thought to have cognates in the Germanic languages, such as the Gothic term wods 'possessed' (though Ludwig Rübekeil 2003 has suggested that the name of the Common Germanic deity  may in fact be an early loanword, an adjective * based on Celtic ).

If the Celtic word *wātis, the Latin vates, and similar Germanic words are cognates rather than borrowings, they can be derived from an Indo-European word  "seer".

The likelihood of this etymology and its relevance to the word vates is, however, doubtful.

History of the institution

Ancient Rome 
The earliest Latin writers used vates to denote prophets and soothsayers in general; the word fell into disuse in Latin until it was revived by Virgil.

In pagan Rome the vates resided on the Vatican Hill, the Hill of the Vates. The Vatican Hill takes its name from the Latin word Vaticanus, a vaticiniis ferendis, in allusion to the oracles, or Vaticinia, which were anciently delivered on the Vatican Hill. (When the papacy was returned to Rome from Avignon (France) in the 14th century, the Vatican became the residence of the Pope, and the word Vatican came to refer to the enclave in the middle of Rome that had become the seat of the Roman Catholic Church.)

Celtic civilisation 
The Vates had the role of seers and performed sacrifices (in particular administering human sacrifice) under the authority of a druid according to Roman and Christian interpretation.

Modern usage

Thomas Carlyle discussed the similarities and differences between the "Vates Prophet" and the "Vates Poet" in On Heroes, Hero-Worship, & the Heroic in History (1841). 

Vates or Ovates make up one of the three grades of the Order of Bards, Ovates and Druids, a neo-druidism order based in England. 

An ovate is also the initial level one can attain in the modern Welsh Gorsedd of Bards. The Gorsedd is not a neo-druidic entity like the one mentioned above, but is more concerned with Welsh arts and culture; however, the ceremony and practices are largely based on reimaginings of druidism by Iolo Morganwg.

Citations

General sources 
 Ellis, Peter Berresford, The Druids, William B. Eerdmans Publishing (1995) 
 Perkins, Caroline A., "Ovid's Erotic Vates" in Helios, March 2000
 Rübekeil, Ludwig, Wodan und andere forschungsgeschichtliche Leichen: exhumiert , Beiträge zur Namenforschung (2003), 25–42.

External links

 Classical descriptions of the vates
 Ovates

Ancient Roman religion
Prophets
Druidry
Italo-Celtic